The Dukedoms of Richmond (in the peerage of England) and of Lennox (in the peerage of Scotland) have usually been held by the same person since 1623.  In 1675, King Charles II created his illegitimate son Charles Lennox Duke of Richmond (created on 9 August 1675) and Duke of Lennox (created on 9 September 1675), and the two Dukedoms have since been held concurrently by Lennox's descendants. Since 1734 he has also held the Dukedom of Aubigny (in the peerage of France).  Since 1876 he has also held the Dukedom of Gordon (in the peerage of the United Kingdom).

Duke of Richmond and Duke of Lennox (1675)

Family tree

See also
Duke of Richmond
Duke of Lennox
Duke of Aubigny
Duke of Gordon

Further reading

Dukedoms